Uğurtaş (also: Kubik and Güyük) is a village in the Akçakale district of Şanlıurfa Province, Turkey. Its population is 385 (2021).

References

Villages in Şanlıurfa Province